The Zenoah G-25 is a single cylinder, two stroke, carburetted aircraft engine, with optional fuel injection, designed for use on ultralight aircraft

Development
The Zenoah G-25 is equipped with single capacitor discharge ignition and a single Mikuni slide-type carburetor. It is equipped with a recoil starter system or optionally electric start and a 2.5 or 2.8:1 belt reduction drive.

The engine runs on a mixture of unleaded auto fuel and oil.

Producing  at 6600 rpm, the G-25 competed in the early 1980s ultralight powerplant market against the similar Rotax 277. Production of the engine was completed in the late 1980s and today only used engines and parts are available.

Applications

Specifications (G-25B-1)

References

Air-cooled aircraft piston engines
Two-stroke aircraft piston engines